is a former Nippon Professional Baseball pitcher for the Tohoku Rakuten Golden Eagles in Japan's Pacific League.

External links

1980 births
Living people
Baseball people from Fukuoka Prefecture
Japanese baseball players
Nippon Professional Baseball pitchers
Orix BlueWave players
Orix Buffaloes players
Tohoku Rakuten Golden Eagles players